The 1959 Major League Baseball All-Star Game was the 26th edition of the midsummer classic between the all-stars of the American League (AL) and National League (NL), the two leagues composing Major League Baseball. The game was played on Tuesday, July 7, at Forbes Field in Pittsburgh, Pennsylvania, home of the Pittsburgh Pirates of the NL, and was a 5–4 victory for the National League. An unprecedented second game was played four weeks later in Los Angeles, California.

Background
In a break from tradition, the league scheduled a "doubleheader" as part of an effort to boost the players' pension fund. The first game was held on Tuesday, July 7, at Forbes Field in Pittsburgh, Pennsylvania, the home of the Pittsburgh Pirates of the National League. The second game was on Monday, August 3, at the Los Angeles Memorial Coliseum in Los Angeles, California, the home of the Los Angeles Dodgers, also of the NL.

The first game resulted in a 5–4 victory for the NL. and the AL won the second game 5–3 for a split. The experiment of two All-Star Games continued for four seasons; the tradition of just one annual game resumed in 1963.

Rosters
Players in italics have since been inducted into the National Baseball Hall of Fame.

American League

National League

-x – Injured and could not play
-y – Injury replacement

Game
Umpires: Al Barlick, Home Plate (NL); Ed Runge, First Base (AL); Augie Donatelli, Second Base (NL); Joe Paparella, Third Base (AL); Shag Crawford, Left Field (NL); Johnny Rice, Right Field (AL)

Starting Lineups

Game Summary

References

External links
Baseball Almanac

Major League Baseball All-Star Game
Major League Baseball All-Star Game
Baseball competitions in Pittsburgh
Major League Baseball All Star Game
July 1959 sports events in the United States
1950s in Pittsburgh